The Concerto for Violin and Orchestra by György Ligeti is a violin concerto written for and dedicated to the violinist Saschko Gawriloff. A performance of the work lasts about 28 minutes.

History
The first version of the concerto consisted of three movements. This version was performed on 3 November 1990 in Cologne. In 1992, Ligeti revised the score by replacing the first movement and adding two new movements. This new version was premiered on 8 October 1992 in Cologne. Finally, he reorchestrated the third and fourth movements, and the final version was first performed on 9 June 1993 by Gawriloff with the Ensemble InterContemporain conducted by Pierre Boulez.

Music

The concerto consists of five movements:

While composing the concerto, Ligeti originally planned an eight-movement work. Parts of the music for the unfinished movements were used by Gawriloff and Ligeti for the cadenza in the final movement, which Ligeti asks the performer to devise as an alternative to the already existing cadenza. Composers who have composed cadenzas for the concerto include John Zorn and Thomas Adès.

The concerto well represents his late style: a synthesis of avant-garde explorations and traditional melodic and formal conventions. The BBC's Stephen Johnson calls the concerto as "a kind of cornucopia of effects and techniques, a wild collage of atmospheres and colors." Among other effects, it uses "microtonality, rapidly changing textures, comic juxtapositions... Hungarian folk melodies, Bulgarian dance rhythms, references to medieval and Renaissance music and solo violin writing that ranges from the slow-paced and sweet-toned to the angular and fiery." During this time, Ligeti was interested in alternate tuning systems and harmonics. Thus, one violin and one viola in the orchestra tune their strings to the natural harmonics of the bass player.

The second movement can be loosely described as a set of variations adapted from the third of his Six Bagatelles for Wind Quintet (an arrangement of the seventh piece from Musica ricercata) but slowed down and nearly two octaves lower.

Instrumentation

The concerto is scored for a solo violin accompanied by an orchestra with the following instrumentation.

Woodwinds

Brass
2 horns in F
1 trumpet in C
1 tenor trombone

Percussion
3 timpani

Strings

4 violins

2 violas
2 violoncellos
1 double bass

References

Notes

External links

1990 compositions
Compositions by György Ligeti
Music dedicated to ensembles or performers
Ligeti

Compositions that use extended techniques